Moscow City may refer to several places:
 the City of Moscow, Russia
 the "Moscow City" International Business Center, a commercial district in central Moscow, Russia